The name Katie has been used for three tropical or subtropical cyclones worldwide, one in the Atlantic Ocean, and two in the Southern Hemisphere. 

In the Atlantic:
 Hurricane Katie (1955) – made landfall in Hispaniola as a Category 2 hurricane
In the Soutern Hemisphere:
 Cyclone Katie (1964) - a strong tropical cyclone that caused minor damage in the Northern Territory
 Subtropical Cyclone Katie - unofficial name given to a rare subtropical cyclone in the Southeast Pacific

See also
List of storms named Kate, a similar named used for nineteen tropical cyclones worldwide

Atlantic hurricane set index articles
Australian region cyclone set index articles